The Summit Inn was a historic U.S. Route 66 roadside diner built in 1952, located at the summit of Cajon Pass in San Bernardino County, California. The building was destroyed by the Blue Cut Fire on August 16, 2016. The building's current owners plan to rebuild the restaurant, as it appeared before the fire.

History
The original Summit Inn was in operation in 1928 and takes its name from its original location at the summit of the Cajon Pass between the westbound and eastbound lanes of US 66.

The present location in unincorporated Oak Hills, California, had been in operation since 1952 when 66 was rerouted along a somewhat lower elevation. 1953-era postcards depict a Horseless Carriage Rally at the Summit Inn which included vintage Ford Model T's.

Cecil “C.A.” Stevens bought the station and restaurant from original builder Burt Riley in 1966; he'd wanted just the Texaco filling station on the site but agreed to buy both if Hilda Fish, a German woman who ran the restaurant, were willing to stay to run the place. Hilda Fish retired in 2002 and is now deceased.

Route 66 in the area was obliterated by Interstate 15 in California by 1970.

On March 27, 2014, an intoxicated driver, Jayson Ernest Johnson of Riverside, California, was arrested for crashing a stolen van into the restaurant, causing $200,000 in damage. The driver pled guilty to a lesser charge and received a suspended sentence. The entire kitchen was rebuilt using an insurance payout and the restaurant re-opened at the end of July 2014.
The vintage building which once served as a Texaco station remained on the property, although gasoline was no longer sold there. The Summit Inn's small gift shop still sold Texaco-related memorabilia and a great many original metal oil company signs decorated the rest of the interior. Other signs included two circa 1939 Standard Oil signs featuring Mickey Mouse and a genuine reflectorized US 66 highway shield.

Notable clients included Elvis Presley (who kicked the jukebox as it had none of his records at the time – an oversight soon fixed – and left without eating), actor Pierce Brosnan, Pearl Bailey, Clint Eastwood and Danny Thomas.

On July 1, 2016, the business was sold to Katherine Juarez and her brother, Otto Recinos, who moved to the area after selling family real estate holdings in Los Angeles.

Business model
The menu at the Summit Inn was typical, inexpensive and satisfying roadside fare, but with a twist: Ostrich and buffalo products were also served, including an ostrich egg omelette and "buffalo burgers."

During the restaurant's operating hours, the original red neon "SUMMIT INN" sign flashed on and off to beckon drivers on present-day Interstate 15. Antique cars could occasionally be spotted in the parking lot.

2016 fire
On August 16, 2016, the diner was destroyed by the Blue Cut Fire. The current owners of the business plan to rebuild, making it appear as identical to the old building as possible.

References

Buildings and structures in San Bernardino County, California
Burned hotels in the United States
U.S. Route 66 in California
Restaurants in California
Tourist attractions along U.S. Route 66
Tourist attractions in San Bernardino County, California
Restaurants established in 1952
1952 establishments in California
Buildings and structures demolished in 2016
Diners in California